|}

The Carlisle Bell is a historic British flat horse race, first contested in 1599 and still run today.  The race's name relates to the bells which were awarded to the winners of the race in the reign of Elizabeth I.  These bells are reputed to be the oldest horse racing prizes in Britain and are now held at the Carlisle Guildhall Museum.

It is run at Carlisle Racecourse over a distance of 7 furlongs and 173 yards (1,566 metres) and it is scheduled to take place each year in June alongside another historic race the Cumberland Plate.

The bells

There are two bells.  The larger one, 2 1/2 inches in diameter, was donated by Lady Dacre in 1559 and bears the inscription:

The second, smaller bell is inscribed 1599 H.B.M.C which is believed to stand for "Henry Baines, Mayor of Carlisle".

Civic records from the 17th century list the bells among four racing prizes competed for at Carlisle.

The bells were thought to have been lost for many years, but were rediscovered in a box in the town clerk's office in the late 19th century.

Winners since 1988

See also
 Horse racing in Great Britain
 List of British flat horse races

References

Racing Post

Bibliography
 

Flat races in Great Britain
Carlisle Racecourse
Open mile category horse races
Recurring sporting events established before 1750